Bert La Bonté is an Australian actor.

Early life 
La Bonté grew up in Melbourne's southeastern suburbs with his parents and two older sisters. His parents migrated from Mauritius in the late 1960s. He discovered a passion for acting at nine when he played Fagin in his school production of Oliver!.

Career 
At 17 La Bonté enrolled in performing arts at the University of Ballarat.

His extensive theatre credits include Rupert, Birdland, Elling, Lungs, Richard III, A Behanding in Spokane, The Female of the Species and The Mountaintop (Melbourne Theatre Company), Phèdre (Bell Shakespeare), I Am a Miracle and The Good Person of Szechuan (Malthouse Theatre).

His musical theatre credits include The 25th Annual Putnam County Spelling Bee (Melbourne Theatre Company/Sydney Theatre Company), An Officer and a Gentleman, Dream Lover: The Bobby Darin Musical, The Book of Mormon (GFO), Grey Gardens, Chess, and Kismet (The Production Company), Guys and Dolls (Ambassador Theatre Group), Next to Normal (Melbourne Theatre Company), Pippin (Kookaburra), Jesus Christ Superstar (UK tour for Really Useful Group), When I Fall In Love – The Nat King Cole Story, and Let’s Get It On – The Life & Music of Marvin Gaye.

His film and television credits include Animal Kingdom, Nightmares and Dreamscapes, Rats and Cats, Salem’s Lot, The Newsreader and My Life is Murder.

Awards 
La Bonté received the Helpmann Award and Sydney Theatre Award for Best Male Actor in a Supporting Role in a Musical in 2012 for his performance in An Officer and a Gentleman. He was also nominated in 2005 for Spelling Bee and again in 2017 for The Book of Mormon.

References

Living people
Australian male stage actors
Australian male film actors
Australian male television actors
Australian actors of African descent
Australian people of Mauritian descent
Year of birth missing (living people)